Chicauma is a mountain range in central Chile. This locale is noted for the impact of a large meteor noted in a report from 1916. The range is also termed Alto de Chicauma or Sierra de Chicauma. A portion of the Chicauma has been added to the La Campana National Park.

See also
 Cerro La Campana
 Kageneckia oblonga

References
 Field Museum of Natural History. 1916. Fieldiana: Geology, Chicago Natural History Museum, Field Columbian Museum
 C. Michael Hogan. 2008. Chilean Wine Palm: Jubaea chilensis, GlobalTwitcher.com, ed. N. Stromberg

Line notes

Mountain ranges of Chile
Landforms of Valparaíso Region